Fabbiano is an Italian surname. Notable people with the surname include:

Pepi Fabbiano, American astrophysicist
Thomas Fabbiano (born 1989), Italian tennis player

See also
Fabbiani

Surnames of Italian origin
Italian-language surnames